Daniel John Stolper (January 11, 1935 – June 8, 2020) was an American oboist.

Career 
Born on Friday, January 11, 1935, the future oboist came into the world toward the end of a rather busy week of musical births, just three days after Elvis Presley in Mississippi and the day after Ronnie Hawkins in adjacent Arkansas.  Stolper attained the position of visiting instructor of the oboe at the Interlochen Arts Academy from 1972.  Stolper would also serve as professor of oboe at Michigan State University.

Stolper's performance experience included: former principal oboist of the San Antonio Symphony, New Orleans Philharmonic, Lansing Symphony, Eastman Chamber Orchestra. With the last-named, he gave the US premiere of Bohuslav Martinů’s Oboe Concerto.

Education 
Stolper's primary teacher was Robert Louis Sprenkle (1914–1988) at the Eastman School of Music.  He also studied with John Mack and Marcel Tabuteau.

References

External links
 Visiting Interlochen Faculty
 

1935 births
2020 deaths
American classical oboists
Male oboists
Interlochen summer faculty
Interlochen Arts Academy faculty